Chicita Frances Culberson (born Chicita Frances Forman, November 1, 1931 in Philadelphia, Pennsylvania) is an American lichenologist.

Education
She graduated with a B.S. from the University of Cincinnati in 1953, where she also met her future husband, Bill Culberson. In 1954, Received an M.S. from the University of Wisconsin in 1954 and in 1959 received a Ph.D. from Duke University.

Career 
A botanical researcher at Duke University, Culberson pioneered the use of thin-layer chromatography in the identification of secondary lichen products.

In 1992, she became one of the first modern recipients of the Acharius Medal.

In 2000, botanist Theodore Esslinger circumscribed Culbersonia, which is a fungal genus in the family Caliciaceae and named in Bill Culberson and Chicita F. Culberson's honour, his "longtime friends and mentors". At the 9th International Association for Lichenology conference held virtually in Brazil on 4 August 2021, the lichen chemistry symposium was dedicated to Culberson for her 90th birthday.

Personal life
Culberson was married to fellow lichenologist Bill Culberson from 1953  until his death in 2003.

See also
 :Category:Taxa named by Chicita F. Culberson

Sources
Biography of Dr Culberson at Lichenology.org

External links
Dr Culberson's faculty page at Duke University
Partial bibliography of Dr Culberson's research at Scientific Commons

Living people
1931 births
Scientists from Philadelphia
University of Cincinnati alumni
University of Wisconsin–Madison alumni
Duke University faculty
American women botanists
American lichenologists
Acharius Medal recipients
21st-century American botanists
American women academics
21st-century American women scientists
Women lichenologists